Damián Ariel Fernández (born 2 January 2002) is an Argentine professional footballer who plays as a centre-back for Vélez Sarsfield.

Club career
Fernández joined the youth system of Vélez Sarsfield in 2015 from Trelew-based Racing Club, who he signed for from Defensores de la Ribera. His move into their senior set-up arrived ahead of the 2019–20 campaign. He made his professional debut on 31 August 2019 in a Primera División fixture with Estudiantes, as the centre-back came off the bench in the second half to replace Cristian Núñez in a one-goal victory.

International career
In May 2019, Fernández was selected to train against Argentina's seniors during the Copa América. In the following months, Fernández appeared with the U18s at the L'Alcúdia International Tournament in Spain.

Career statistics
.

References

External links

2001 births
Living people
Sportspeople from Buenos Aires Province
Argentine footballers
Argentina youth international footballers
Association football defenders
Argentine Primera División players
Club Atlético Vélez Sarsfield footballers